Hans Domnick (1909–1985) was a German film editor, film producer and documentary maker. His brother was the Producer/Director Ottomar Domnick. In Germany he is best remembered for his two-part documentary from 1958 Dream Road of the World ("Traumstraße der Welt"), re-released in 1968 in one part as Dream Road of the World, which described the Pan-American Highway from Alaska to Tierra del Fuego.

Selected filmography

Producer
 Amico (1949)
 Doctor Praetorius (1950)
 The House in Montevideo (1951)
 Hocuspocus (1953)
 The House in Montevideo (1963)
 Praetorius (1965)

Editor
 Violanta (1942)
 Gabriele Dambrone (1943)
 Why Are You Lying, Elisabeth? (1944)

Director
 My Sixteen Sons (1956)

External links

1909 births
1985 deaths
Film people from Mecklenburg-Western Pomerania
People from Greifswald
German expatriates in the United States